The Italian Caritas is the charitable arm of the Italian Bishops Conference.  Its purpose is to promote "the testimony of charity in the Italian ecclesiastical community, in forms that are appropriate to the times and needs, for integral human development, social justice and peace, with special attention to the poor and primary pedagogical functions"" (art.1 of the Statute).

History
In 1970 pope Paul VI dissolved the Italian Pontificia Opera Missionaria (POA, Pontifical Missionary Work), a charity that had been supported by American Roman Catholics and that was at direct dependency of the Apostolic See. It had managed Italian charity work during the Two World Wars and during the first postwar period.

On November 14, 1970, the 7th General Assembly of the Episcopal Conference of Italy (C.E.I.) voted an approval, following the papal recommendations. With the decree n° 1727/71 of 2 July 1971, the C.E.I. approved the first statute of the Italian diocesan "Caritas" that were appointed of the Church's charitable activities.

On September 28, 1972, there have been the first national meeting of the diocesan Caritas. Three years later, Naples hosted the first national meeting between Church and lay people whose title was "Volunteering and human promotion", dedicated to the arising questions of the socalled Third Sector.

On June 10, 1977, Caritas Italiana and the Italian Ministry of Defence signed an agreement that added the former Pontificia Opera Missionaria in the list of entities in which the conscientious objectors had the faculty to carry out the civil service. That list was public and readable within the military districts.

In 2021, Caritas Italiana made 1.5 millions interventions happen and, in its listening centers gave support to 227,566 people (7.7% more than in 2020).

References

Charities based in Italy